Jan Szczęsny Herburt (12 January 1567 – 31 December 1616) was a Polish political writer, diplomat and a member of the Polish Sejm parliament. An early supporter of Chancellor Jan Zamoyski, he took part in many diplomatic missions, most notably to Sweden, United Kingdom, the Vatican and the Ottoman Empire. He supported the election of King Sigismund III of Poland to the throne, but then became his adversary and joined the leaders of the infamous Zebrzydowski Rebellion in 1607. As a rebel, he was imprisoned by royalists from 1607 to 1609. Herburt was an author of many rebellion-related and anti-magnate treaties. He was also a founder of the Kudryntsi Castle.

Jan Szczęsny Herburt hailed from a Polonized German-Ruthenian family. Himself a Roman Catholic, he opposed the Union of Brest and attempted to protect the Eastern Orthodox minority in the east from Polonization. His initiative of printing the Stanisław Orzechowski annals and Jan Dlugosz chronicles was criticized by Sigismund III who suspended the publication and confiscated his Dobromyl estates.

Bibliography
 Bibliografia Literatury Polskiej – Nowy Korbut, t. 2 Piśmiennictwo Staropolskie, Państwowy Instytut Wydawniczy, Warsaw 1964, pages 259-263

References

Polish rebels
1567 births
1616 deaths
Ruthenian nobility of the Polish–Lithuanian Commonwealth
Members of the Sejm of the Polish–Lithuanian Commonwealth